Euler's formula, named after Leonhard Euler, is a mathematical formula in complex analysis that establishes the fundamental relationship between the trigonometric functions and the complex exponential function. Euler's formula states that for any real number :

This complex exponential function is sometimes denoted  ("cosine plus i sine"). The formula is still valid if  is a complex number, and so some authors refer to the more general complex version as Euler's formula.

Euler's formula is ubiquitous in mathematics, physics, and engineering. The physicist Richard Feynman called the equation "our jewel" and "the most remarkable formula in mathematics".

History
In 1714, the English mathematician Roger Cotes presented a geometrical argument that can be interpreted (after correcting a misplaced factor of ) as:

Exponentiating this equation yields Euler's formula.

Around 1740 Leonhard Euler turned his attention to the exponential function and derived the equation named after him by comparing the series expansions of the exponential and trigonometric expressions. The formula was first published in 1748 in his foundational work Introductio in analysin infinitorum.

Johann Bernoulli had found that

And since

the above equation tells us something about complex logarithms by relating natural logarithms to imaginary (complex) numbers. Bernoulli, however, did not evaluate the integral.

Bernoulli's correspondence with Euler (who also knew the above equation) shows that Bernoulli did not fully understand complex logarithms. Euler also suggested that complex logarithms can have infinitely many values.

The view of complex numbers as points in the complex plane was described about 50 years later by Caspar Wessel.

Definitions of complex exponentiation

The exponential function  for real values of  may be defined in a few different equivalent ways (see Characterizations of the exponential function). In particular we may use any of the three following definitions, which are equivalent.

Differential equation definition

The exponential function  is the unique differentiable function of a complex variable for which the derivative equals the function  and

Power series definition
For complex 

Using the ratio test, it is possible to show that this power series has an infinite radius of convergence and so defines  for all complex .

Limit definition
For complex 

Here,  is restricted to positive integers, so there is no question about what the power with exponent  means.

Proofs
Various proofs of the formula are possible.

Using differentiation
This proof shows that the quotient of the trigonometric and exponential expressions is the constant function one, so they must be equal (the exponential function is never zero, so this is permitted).

Consider the function  

for real . Differentiating gives by the product rule

Thus,  is a constant. Since , then  for all real , and thus

Using power series
Here is a proof of Euler's formula using power-series expansions, as well as basic facts about the powers of :

Using now the power-series definition from above, we see that for real values of 

The rearrangement of terms is justified because each series is absolutely convergent.

Using polar coordinates
Another proof is based on the fact that all complex numbers can be expressed in polar coordinates.

Therefore, differentiating both sides gives

This proves the formula

Applications

Applications in complex number theory

Interpretation of the formula

This formula can be interpreted as saying that the function  is a unit complex number, i.e., it traces out the unit circle in the complex plane as  ranges through the real numbers. Here  is the angle that a line connecting the origin with a point on the unit circle makes with the positive real axis, measured counterclockwise and in radians.

In fact, the same proof shows that Euler's formula is even valid for all complex numbers .

A point in the complex plane can be represented by a complex number written in cartesian coordinates. Euler's formula provides a means of conversion between cartesian coordinates and polar coordinates. The polar form simplifies the mathematics when used in multiplication or powers of complex numbers. Any complex number , and its complex conjugate, can be written as

where
 is the real part,
 is the imaginary part,
.

Use of the formula to define the logarithm of complex numbers

Now, taking this derived formula, we can use Euler's formula to define the logarithm of a complex number. To do this, we also use the definition of the logarithm (as the inverse operator of exponentiation):

and that

Therefore, one can write:

for any . Taking the logarithm of both sides shows that

and in fact, this can be used as the definition for the complex logarithm. The logarithm of a complex number is thus a multi-valued function, because  is multi-valued.

Finally, the other exponential law

which can be seen to hold for all integers , together with Euler's formula, implies several trigonometric identities, as well as de Moivre's formula.

Relationship to trigonometry

Euler's formula, the definitions of the trigonometric functions and the standard identities for exponentials are sufficient to easily derive most trigonometric identities. It provides a powerful connection between analysis and trigonometry, and provides an interpretation of the sine and cosine functions as weighted sums of the exponential function:

The two equations above can be derived by adding or subtracting Euler's formulas:

and solving for either cosine or sine.

These formulas can even serve as the definition of the trigonometric functions for complex arguments . For example, letting , we have:

Complex exponentials can simplify trigonometry, because they are easier to manipulate than their sinusoidal components. One technique is simply to convert sinusoids into equivalent expressions in terms of exponentials. After the manipulations, the simplified result is still real-valued. For example:

Another technique is to represent the sinusoids in terms of the real part of a complex expression and perform the manipulations on the complex expression. For example:

Topological interpretation

In the language of topology, Euler's formula states that the imaginary exponential function  is a (surjective) morphism of topological groups from the real line  to the unit circle . These observations may be combined and summarized in the commutative diagram below:

Other applications

In differential equations, the function  is often used to simplify solutions, even if the final answer is a real function involving sine and cosine. The reason for this is that the exponential function is the eigenfunction of the operation of differentiation.

In electrical engineering, signal processing, and similar fields, signals that vary periodically over time are often described as a combination of sinusoidal functions (see Fourier analysis), and these are more conveniently expressed as the sum of exponential functions with imaginary exponents, using Euler's formula. Also, phasor analysis of circuits can include Euler's formula to represent the impedance of a capacitor or an inductor.

In the four-dimensional space of quaternions, there is a sphere of imaginary units. For any point  on this sphere, and  a real number, Euler's formula applies:

and the element is called a versor in quaternions. The set of all versors forms a 3-sphere in the 4-space.

See also
 Complex number
 Euler's identity
 Integration using Euler's formula
 
 List of things named after Leonhard Euler

References

Further reading

External links
Elements of Algebra

Theorems in complex analysis
Articles containing proofs
Analysis
E (mathematical constant)
Trigonometry
Leonhard Euler